Muhammad Inuwa Idris (born 1960) is a retired Nigerian Army major general who served as the 26th Commandant of the Nigerian Defence Academy (NDA). He was appointed Commandant on 26 December 2013 and succeeded as Commandant by Major General M.T. Ibrahim on 9 August 2015.

Background and education
Idris was enlisted as Officer Cadet at the Nigerian Defence Academy in 1980 and was commissioned as a second lieutenant in 1983. He was posted to the Infantry Corps on commission but was redeployed to the Intelligence Corps.

Maj Gen Idris holds two master's degrees from the US National Defense University (NDU) in Washington DC: the first is Master of Science in National Security Strategy obtained from the National War College while the second is Master of Arts in Strategic Security Studies obtained from the College of International Security Affairs. He also holds a Graduate Certificate in International Counterterrorism from NDU, a bachelor's degree in War Studies from University of Baluchistan, Quetta, Pakistan; and a Postgraduate Diploma, in Diplomatic Studies from the University of Westminster, London, UK.

Career
Prior to becoming Commandant of the NDA, Maj Gen Idris was the Deputy Commandant and Director of Studies of the Nigerian National Defence College. His previous assignments include:
Commandant of the Nigerian Army Intelligence School (NAIS)
Directing Staff at the National Defence College
Chief of Staff Nigerian Army Intelligence Corps
Colonel General Staff Nigerian Army Intelligence Corps
Military Assistant and Principal General Staff Officer,  Office of the National Security Adviser
Commander Strategic Intelligence Support Group
Officer Commanding Field Intelligence Detachment
Deputy Defence Adviser
Officer Commanding VIP Protection Detachment
Staff Officer Coordination
Desk Officer
Infantry Platoon Commander

References 

Living people
Nigerian generals
Nigerian Army officers
Nigerian Defence Academy alumni
1960 births
National War College alumni
Nigerian Defence Academy people
Nigerian Defence Academy Commandants